Leonardus Roselli (died 1606) was a Roman Catholic prelate who served as Bishop of Vulturara e Montecorvino (1597–1606).

Biography
On 10 November 1597, Leonardus Roselli was appointed during the papacy of Pope Clement VIII as Bishop of Vulturara e Montecorvino. He served as Bishop of Vulturara e Montecorvino until his death on 1606.

Episcopal succession
While bishop, he was the principal co-consecrator of:
Valeriano Muti, Bishop of Bitetto (1599);
Baccio Gherardini, Bishop of Fiesole (1615);
Fabio Piccolomini, Bishop of Massa Marittima (1615);
Bernardino Buratti, Bishop of Vulturara e Montecorvino (1615);
Giovanni dei Gualtieri, Bishop of Sansepolcro (1615);
François de La Valette Cornusson, Coadjutor Bishop of Vabres (1618); and 
Paolo Faraone, Bishop of Siracusa (1619).

References

External links and additional sources 
 (for Chronology of Bishops) 
 (for Chronology of Bishops) 

16th-century Italian Roman Catholic bishops
1606 deaths
Bishops appointed by Pope Clement VIII
17th-century Italian Roman Catholic bishops